Eagle is an abstract sculpture by Alexander Calder.
It is located at the Olympic Sculpture Park, Seattle.

History

It was located at the Bank One building, 500 Throckmorton Street, Fort Worth, Texas.
It was commissioned by Fort Worth National Bank.
It was constructed in 1971 of painted sheet steel. It was erected, and dedicated on February 15, 1974. 
It was relocated in 2000 after being purchased by the Seattle Art Museum with funding from Jon and Mary Shirley.

References

External links
http://metroplexing.blogspot.com/2011/03/missing-art-of-metroplex-what-did.html
http://www.thadsworld.net/2011/01/perspective-alexander-calder-eagle/
Eagle by Alexander Calder, wikimapia

1971 sculptures
Abstract sculptures in Washington (state)
Sculptures of birds in the United States
Olympic Sculpture Park
Outdoor sculptures in Seattle
Outdoor sculptures in Texas
Sculptures by Alexander Calder
Steel sculptures in Washington (state)